Iago (Pron: Eye-a'-go) is a census-designated place (CDP) in Wharton County, Texas, United States. This was a new CDP formed from parts of the Boling-Iago CDP prior to the 2010 census with a population of 161.

Geography
Iago is located at  (29.266512, -95.963005).

References

Census-designated places in Wharton County, Texas
Census-designated places in Texas